Air mobile brigade, a specialised form of military brigade dedicated to carrying out air assault, may refer to:

16th Air Assault Brigade, British Army
4th Airmobile Brigade (France), French Army
11 Luchtmobiele Brigade, Royal Netherlands Army
Air Mobile Brigade (Sri Lanka), Sri Lanka Army
Ukrainian Air Assault Forces
46th Airmobile Brigade
77th Airmobile Brigade
81st Airmobile Brigade (Ukraine)

See also
Air assault

Airborne infantry brigades